"The Frightened City" is a song by British group the Shadows, released as a single in April 1961. It peaked at number 3 on the UK Singles Chart.

Background and release
"The Frightened City" was composed by Norrie Paramor as title music to the gangster film The Frightened City, and it was performed by a studio orchestra. Prior to the film's release, the Shadows recorded and released their own version of the tune in April 1961. It was released with the B-side "Back Home", written by Jim Goff, Hank Marvin, Bruce Welch and Jet Harris. "The Frightened City" was the group's second recording of a film tune, having released a version of "Man of Mystery" in November 1960.

Reviewing for Disc, Don Nicholl wrote that "The Frightened City" "has the sort of steady dark drama in it which fits their kind of music perfectly". He also wrote that "Back Home" "has the Latin in it. Gently tuneful and away from the conventional Shadows sound here and there".

Track listing
7": Columbia / DB 4637
 "The Frightened City" – 2:22
 "Back Home" – 2:41

Personnel
 Hank Marvin – electric lead guitar
 Bruce Welch – acoustic rhythm guitar
 Jet Harris – electric bass guitar
 Tony Meehan – drums

Charts

Cover versions
 In 1965, Norrie Paramor and His Orchestra covered the song on his album Shadows in America.
 In 1996, Peter Frampton covered the song on the various artists tribute album Twang!: A Tribute to Hank Marvin & the Shadows.

References

1961 singles
1961 songs
1960s instrumentals
The Shadows songs
Columbia Graphophone Company singles
Song recordings produced by Norrie Paramor